The 2005 World Modern Pentathlon Championships were held in Warsaw, Poland from August 6 to August 8.

Medal summary

Men's events

Women's events

Medal table

See also
 World Modern Pentathlon Championship

References

 Sport123

Modern pentathlon in Europe
World Modern Pentathlon Championships, 2005
World Modern Pentathlon Championships, 2005
Sports competitions in Warsaw
International sports competitions hosted by Poland
August 2005 sports events in Europe
2000s in Warsaw